The Coleman House is an historic house located in Bedford, Kentucky, it was listed on the National Register of Historic Places in 1983.

It was deemed the "most outstanding example of a Federal style dwelling in Bedford, as well as the county."

See also
William L. Coleman House, also in Bedford and also listed on the National Register

References

National Register of Historic Places in Trimble County, Kentucky
Federal architecture in Kentucky
Houses on the National Register of Historic Places in Kentucky
Houses in Trimble County, Kentucky